ACS Supporter 2.0, but mostly known as Fotbal Club Victoria Cluj (due to Victoria Cluj brand legal own), also known as Victoria Cluj or simply as Victoria, was a Romanian amateur football club based in Cluj-Napoca, Cluj County, Romania, founded in 1920, dissolved in 1947, refounded in 2019, jus to be dissolved again in 2022.

History
The team of the Mănăştur neighbourhood, at first it was formed by students of the Commercial Academy from Cluj, in 1920 (colours: white-red) as a result of the merger between Dacia and CS Victoria. One of the men who contributed to the birth of the club was arh. Virgil Salvan.

The club participates at the official competitions in Romania starting with 1921, and plays two consecutive championship finals: in 1921–22 against  Chinezul Timişoara 1–5 (team used: Maksay – Husza, Doczi – Polocsai, Szilágy, Chifor – I. Istvánffy, Cipcigan, L. Istvánffy, Szántó, Rozvan); and in 1922–23 again against Chinezul Timişoara 0–3 (team used: A. Molnár – Doczi, Chifor – Polocsai, Szilágy, Farkas – I. Istvánffy, Magyeri, Barabás, Cipcigan, L. Istvánffy).

In 1925–26 it again won the regional championship, but lost 1–3 at AMEF Arad in the preliminary round of the final tournament.

In 1927 it changed its name to România Cluj, and under this name it qualified for the 1927–28 final tournament, where it lost in the quarter-finals 0–2 at Jiul Lupeni.

At the 1928–29 final tournament again reached the final, only to lose again, this time to Venus București, 2–3. (Team used: A. Molnár – Doczi, Chifor – Doboşan, Bradea, Baba – Tabacu, Deheleanu, Huniade, Cipcigan, Novac). Players who were not used: Pop, Caliani, Albu, Sfera, Mureşan, the Istvánffy brothers, Florea, Sepi II, Bindea, Cobîrzan, Micu, Győrkő, Kinizsi.

The club participates from the very first edition of the divisional Romanian first league. During this period, the people in charge of the club were: prof. univ. Coriolan Tătaru, dr. N. Birăescu, prof. univ. dr. Liviu Pop, Patriciu Curea, Constantin Schipor. The players used were: A. Molnár, Chifor, Chindrean I, Chindrean II, Kreishoffer, Felecan I, Felecan II, Mureşan, Schetan, Ciungan, Fărcăşan, Munteanu I, Munteanu II, Pop I, Cipcigan, Căpuşan, Daci, Pintea, Nistor, Burdan, Straja, Pop II, Pop III, Feraru, Lazăr.

Starting with 1936 the club changes back its name to Victoria and continues to compete in the First League. Players added were: Burdan, Boşneag, Sepci, Pál, Nistor, Pop IV, Cornea, Cociuban I, Cociuban II, Szantai, Ţăranu, B. Marian.

During World War II the clubs activity is very reduced. It reappears in the 1946–47 edition of the Divizia B, after which it dissolves and disappears.

The club was reestablished in 2019 and was enlisted in the fourth league (county league), but was dissolved again in the summer of 2022, after failed to promote in the Liga III.

Honours
Liga I:
Runners-up (3): 1921–22, 1922–23, 1928–29

Liga IV – Cluj County:
Winners (1): 2021–22
Runners-up (2): 2019–20, 2020–21

League history

Notable former players
The footballers enlisted below have had international cap(s) for their respective countries at junior and/or senior level.

Romania
  Alexandru Chifor
  Vasile Cipcigan
  Andrei Criza
  Iacob Felecan
  Ioan Krieshoffer

Romania
  Alexandru Leitner
  Nicolae Munteanu
  Gheorghe Mureșanu
  Grațian Sepi
  Andrei Sepci

References

External links

Association football clubs established in 1920
Association football clubs disestablished in 2022
Defunct football clubs in Romania
Football clubs in Cluj County
Sport in Cluj-Napoca
Liga I clubs
Liga II clubs
Liga IV clubs
1920 establishments in Romania
2022 disestablishments in Romania